Salamé is a Lebanese last name which means "peaceable". It derives from a personal first name, and the Semitic word S-L-M meaning "peace".

Among Maronites, the name may derive from the Syriac word "Shlama" or "Shlomo" (ܫܠܡܐ) in the Western Syriac dialect deriving from a Proto-Semitic *šalām-.

The name is found across Lebanon primarily among Maronites, as well as Greek Orthodox Christians, Melkite Greek Catholics, and Shia Muslims.

The name has, but is not limited to, alternative spellings such as: Saleme, Salame, Salameh, Salemeh, and Seleme.

Notable people with the surname include:

Salame / Salamé
Anthony Salame, Australian comedian and radio host
Ghassan Salamé (born 1951), Lebanese academic, Minister of Culture 2000-03
Jean Salamé, French slalom canoeist and silver medalist at the ICF Canoe Slalom World Championships
Jihad Salame (born 1962), Lebanese Olympic sprinter
Joseph Salamé (1914–2004), Lebanese Maronite Catholic archbishop, apostolic administrator of the Maronite Catholic Eparchy of Latakia and Archeparch of the Maronite Catholic Archeparchy of Aleppo
Léa Salamé (born 1979), Lebanese-born French journalist and daughter of Ghassan Salamé
Ramzi T. Salamé (born 1953), Lebanese writer and artist
Toni Salame (born 1963), Lebanese Olympic skier
Tony Salamé, Lebanese-Italian retail magnate, businessman and art collector, as well as the CEO and Chairman of Aïshti, who received the Order of Merit of the Italian Republic

Salameh
George Salameh, Lebanese Olympic alpine skier
Riad Salameh (born 1950), Governor of Lebanon's central bank (Banque du Liban) since 1993

Seleme
Hugo Seleme (born 1968), Argentinean political philosopher and professor of Ethics and Jurisprudence

See also
Salameh (disambiguation)
Salama (disambiguation) / Salamah
Salami (disambiguation)